Margaret Jepkirui Muthwii (born 13 October 1957) is a Kenyan academic who has been vice-chancellor of Pan Africa Christian University since January 2014.

She was educated at the University of Nairobi (BA, 1980) and the University of East Anglia (MA, 1986; PhD, 1994). She was previously a senior lecturer at Kenyatta University.

Publications
 Language use in pluri-lingual socieites : the significance of code-switching, 1986
 Variability in language use : a study of Kalenjin speakers of English and Kiswahili in Kenya, 1994
 New language bearings in Africa : a fresh quest, 2003

References

1957 births
Living people
University of Nairobi alumni
Alumni of the University of East Anglia
Vice-chancellors of universities in Kenya
20th-century Kenyan writers
21st-century Kenyan writers
20th-century Kenyan women writers
21st-century Kenyan women writers